Otto Trefný (9 February 1932 in Slavětín nad Ohří – 2 March 2019) was a Czech medical doctor and communist politician who served as an MP, and also as physician of the national ice hockey team. He was a member of the Czech Ice Hockey Hall of Fame.

References

1932 births
2019 deaths
People from Louny District
Communist Party of Czechoslovakia politicians
Members of the Chamber of the People of Czechoslovakia (1981–1986)
Members of the Chamber of the People of Czechoslovakia (1986–1990)
Place of death missing
Czechoslovak physicians